Tosh (also "Tash"; Hebrew/Yiddish: טאהש) is a Hasidic dynasty originating in Nyirtass, Hungary. Today, it is based in Kiryas Tosh, Quebec, Canada, outside Boisbriand, Quebec, a suburb of Montreal, Quebec.  The current leader is Grand Rabbi Elimelch Halevi Segal-Loewy, who succeeded his late father, Meshulim Feish Lowy, upon the latter's death on 12 August 2015. Tosher Hasidim have synagogues in the United States, in Boro Park, Williamsburg, Brooklyn, Kiryas Joel, and Monsey, as well as in Montreal and in London, England.

The Tosh dynasty
The first Tosher Rebbe was Grand Rabbi Meshulam Feish Segal-Loewy I, a disciple of Rabbi David Spira of Dinov son of Rebbe Tzvi Elimelech Spira of Dinov known as the author of Bnei Yissachar, who was a nephew of Rebbe Elimelech of Lizhensk and a disciple of Rebbe Menachem Mendel of Rimanov, and a disciple of Rebbe Yisroel Hopstein. and a disciple of Rebbe Yaakov Yitzchak of Lublin known as The Chozeh, The Chozeh was a disciple of Rebbe Elimelech of Lizhensk, author of Noam Elimelech. The Rebbe Elimelech was a disciple of the Rebbe Dovber, the Maggid (Preacher) of Mezeritch, the primary disciple of the Baal Shem Tov, the founder of Hasidism.

Grand Rabbi Meshulam Feish Segal-Lowy I of Tosh - disciple of Rabbi David Spira of Dinov
Grand Rabbi Elimelech Segal-Lowy of Tosh (1865–1942), son of Rebbe Meshulam Feish and disciple of Rabbi Eliezer Tzvi Safrin of Komarno, son of Rabbi Yitzchak Eisik Yehuda Yechiel Safrin of Komarno
Grand Rabbi Mordechai Segal-Lowy of Demecser - son of Rebbe Elimelech of Tosh
Grand Rabbi Meshulam Feish Segal-Lowy II of Tosh (1921–2015), reviver of the Tosh dynasty after the Holocaust - son of Rebbe Mordechai of Demetsche and his wife Tzirl
Grand Rabbi Elimelech Segal-Lowy of Tosh - present Grand Rebbe of Tosh - son of Rebbe Meshulam Feish Segal-Lowy of Tosh

The Tosh community was revived after the Holocaust by Rabbi Meshulim Feish Lowy (Magyarized form: Lőwy Ferencz), the Rebbe of Tosh. Rabbi Lőwy was born in Nyirtass, Hungary, in 5682 Anno Mundi (1921 or 1922). He survived the Holocaust in the Hungarian Labour Service, and was liberated by the Red Army from a camp outside Marghita in October 1944. The few surviving Hasidim of his father, Grand Rebbe Mordechai Márton Lőwy, who perished in Auschwitz with most of his extended family, appointed him their Rebbe, and he established his court in Nyíregyháza. In 1951, fearing the Communist government, he ordered his followers to leave Hungary, and emigrated to Canada, settling in Montreal. In 1963, he and his Hasidim purchased an area in Boisbriand, Quebec, forming the enclave of Kiryas Tosh. Lőwy was married to Chava (née Weingarten), a direct descendant of Rebbe Elimelech of Lizhensk, from 1946 until her death in 1996. He married Malka Hass in 2007.

The Tosh community is headed by Rabbi Elimelech Segal-Lowy, the current Rebbe of Tosh.

Collected teachings
Many of Rabbi Meshulim Feish Lőwy's sermons and discourses have been written down in a series of five books entitled Avodas Avodah. Two of them are Hebrew-language books that explain the weekly Torah portions, and the Jewish holidays, with practical insights into divine service which are subtitled: Dibros Kodesh. Further two are Yiddish-language books that explain the weekly Torah portions, and the Jewish holidays, with practical insights into divine service which are entitled: Imros Kodesh. Another is mostly in Hebrew, but has Yiddish segments. It is a compilation of addresses that the Tosher Rebbe has made regarding the Yahrzeit (day of passing) of a large number of Jewish holy men, arranged according to the Jewish calendar. It is subtitled Sichos Kodesh. A second volumes of "Sichos Kodesh" appeared in 2009.

External links
 Tosh, Between Earth and Moon, a Hasidic Rebbe's Followers and his Teachings, article by William Shaffir and Justin Jaron Lewis
 Welcome to Tosh
 The Tusher Rebbe
 Picture Collection of Tosher Rebbe
 Video Clips of the Tosher Rebbe
 Seforim of the Tosher Rebbe
 Kiryas Tosh Official Website

Ashkenazi Jewish culture in Quebec
Hasidic dynasties
Jewish Hungarian history
Hasidic anti-Zionism
Hungarian-Jewish diaspora
Orthodox Judaism in Quebec